Brookula galapagana is a species of sea snail, a marine gastropod mollusk, unassigned in the superfamily Seguenzioidea.

Description
The height of the shell reaches 2.5 mm.

Distribution
This species occurs in the Pacific Ocean off the Galapagos Islands.

References

External links
 To World Register of Marine Species
 

galapagana
Gastropods described in 1913